Yosmel Montes (born 26 June 1977) is a retired Cuban hammer thrower.



Career

He won the gold medal at the 2001 Central American and Caribbean Championships. He became Cuban champion in 2000, 2001 and 2004, forming a rivalry with Yosvany Suárez and Erick Jiménez.

He achieved his personal best throw of 74.77m in April 2002 in Havana, beating his previous record, also set in Havana, of 71.77m in May 2001.

Achievements

References

1977 births
Living people
Cuban male hammer throwers
20th-century Cuban people
21st-century Cuban people